WCWB may refer to:

 WCWB (FM), a radio station (104.9 FM) licensed to serve Marathon, Wisconsin, United States
 WYBA, a radio station (90.1 FM) licensed to Coldwater, Michigan, United States, which used the call sign WCWB from June 2006 to June 2010
 WMGT-TV, a television station (channel 40, virtual channel 41) licensed to Macon, Georgia, United States, which used the call signs WCWB or WCWB-TV from 1968 to December 1983
 WPNT, a television station (channel 42, virtual channel 22) licensed to Pittsburgh, Pennsylvania, United States, which used the call sign WCWB from January 1998 to April 2006
 World Council for the Welfare of the Blind